Lankershim may refer to:

People
Isaac Lankershim (1818–1882), early developer of Los Angeles' San Fernando Valley
James Boon Lankershim (1850–1931), son of Isaac Lankershim

Places
Lankershim Hotel, a now-demolished hotel on the corner of Broadway and 7th Avenue in Downtown Los Angeles
Lankershim Hotel, San Francisco
Lankershim station of the San Francisco and San Joaquin Valley Railroad in California
Lankershim Boulevard, a major north–south thoroughfare in Los Angeles' San Fernando Valley
 Lankershim, Los Angeles County, California (1896–1927) an archaic placename for what is now North Hollywood, Los Angeles, or adjacent West Lankershim (?–1927)
Lankershim Depot in North Hollywood, built 1896 as Toluca Depot of the Southern Pacific Railroad, used 1911–1952 as dual Southern Pacific-Pacific Electric station
Lankershim Reading Room, LAHCM 978, see list of Los Angeles Historic-Cultural Monuments in the San Fernando Valley
Lankershim Arts Center in North Hollywood
Lankershim Elementary School in North Hollywood

See also